Mustafapaşa, formerly known as Sinasos (Greek: Σινασός), is a small town in the Ürgüp district of Nevşehir province, Turkey. In 2011 its population was 3,000.

The Mustafa Paşa after whom the modern town is named was Mustafa Kemal Atatürk, the great war leader and first president of Turkey.

Like most of Cappadocia, Mustafapaşa used to depend for a living on agriculture., especially grape-growing. However, it lies within the region of Cappadocia, and increasingly depends on tourism for its living with new hotels opening all the time.

The town centre is home to a vocational high school party housed in a 19th-century medrese.

History 

Alongside its Turkish Muslim population, 19th-century Mustafapaşa also had a large Greek community and was known as Sinasos. Many of the Greeks were actually what became now as Karamanlides (Christians who spoke Turkish but wrote it using the Greek alphabet). Since it was hard to make a living in Central Anatolia, many Sinasos Greeks migrated to Constantinople/Istanbul at this time and made a name for themselves as traders in seafood, especially caviare. Often they sent money back to their families in Sinasos and some of this was used to build the grand mansions that still survive in the town (and are rapidly being converted into hotels).  

In 1924, however, according to the terms of the Treaty of Lausanne the entire Christian population of Sinasos was forced to leave for Greece in  the Population exchange between Greece and Turkey.  They mostly resettled in Nea Sinasos (New Sinasos), a town in the northern part of the island of Euboea in Greece. In their place came Macedonian Muslims and Turks from Kastoria, a town in northern Greece.  After the population exchange years the town lost much of its former prosperity although it is now well on the way to recovery.

Attractions 
Amongst the many fine stone houses in Mustafapaşa one of the best is the Old Greek House which now houses a popular restaurant. Its upstairs floor contains one of the secular murals which are a feature of both Ürgüp and Mustafapaşa, and which live on as a reminder of the lost minority populations. The first series of the hit television series Asmalı Konak was filmed in and around the Old Greek House in 2002.

In the town centre, the large 19th-century Church of Sts Helena and Constantine, with a grapevine carved around its entrance, is another reminder of the lost populations. It is occasionally used for concerts.

Cappadocia is known for its frescoed rock-cut churches and the Church of St Basil in Mustafapaşa is an example of one such  church that continued in use into the 19th century when it was recut and repainted. 

Several more traditional rock-cut churches can be found in the valley running out from Mustafapaşa which is easily accessible on foot. Most striking is the Monastery of St Nicholas which was restored in 2012 and, unfortunately, contains modern icons brought from Greece. It also has a grand entrance which was built after the law prohibiting repairs to old churches was repealed in 1856. The Church of St Stephen contains a rock lectern supported by a stone eagle while the Sinasos Church has a stone pulpit, these features almost certainly improvements paid for from the sale of seafood in Constantinople.

In the nearby Gomeda Valley there is also the early 10th-century frescoed Church of the Holy Apostles.

References 

Towns in Turkey
Populated places in Nevşehir Province
Ürgüp
Former Greek towns in Turkey
Pomak communities in Turkey